Rick Insell (born June 5, 1951) is the current head coach for the Middle Tennessee State University women's basketball team.

Career
He was the head coach of the Shelbyville Central High School girls' basketball team for 28 seasons. Coach Insell compiled a record of 775–148 and won 10 state championships and won, a Tennessee record, 110 straight games. Insell was inducted into the Women's Basketball Hall of Fame in 2017.

Head coaching record

References 

1951 births
Living people
American women's basketball coaches
Basketball coaches from Tennessee
High school basketball coaches in the United States
Middle Tennessee Blue Raiders women's basketball coaches
Middle Tennessee State University alumni
People from Woodbury, Tennessee